In Greek mythology, Timandra (Ancient Greek: Τιμάνδρα) was a Spartan princess and later on, queen of Arcadia.

Family 
Timandra was one of the daughters of King Tyndareus and Leda, daughter of King Thestius of Pleuron, Aetolia. Thus, she was the (half-)sister of the divine twins, Castor and Pollux, Helen, Clytemnestra, Phoebe and Philonoe. Timandra married Echemus, the king of Arcadia and bore him a son Ladocus.

Mythology 
Like Clytemnestra, she was also unfaithful and deserted Echemus for Phyleus, the king of Dulichium.

This can be explained by the following account with Stesichorus and Hesiod as the authorities:

 "Steischorus says that while sacrificing to the gods Tyndareus forgot Aphrodite and that the goddess was angry and made his daughters twice and thrice wed and deserters of their husbands . . . And Hesiod also says:
"And laughter-loving Aphrodite felt jealous when she looked on them and cast them into evil report. Then Timandra deserted Echemus and went and came to Phyleus, dear to the deathless gods; and even so Clytaemnestra deserted god-like Agamemnon and lay with Aegisthus and chose a worse mate; and even so Helen dishonoured the couch of golden-haired Menelaus."

Notes

References 

 Apollodorus, The Library with an English Translation by Sir James George Frazer, F.B.A., F.R.S. in 2 Volumes, Cambridge, MA, Harvard University Press; London, William Heinemann Ltd. 1921. ISBN 0-674-99135-4. Online version at the Perseus Digital Library. Greek text available from the same website.
Hesiod, Catalogue of Women from Homeric Hymns, Epic Cycle, Homerica translated by Evelyn-White, H G. Loeb Classical Library Volume 57. London: William Heinemann, 1914. Online version at theio.com
 Pausanias, Description of Greece with an English Translation by W.H.S. Jones, Litt.D., and H.A. Ormerod, M.A., in 4 Volumes. Cambridge, MA, Harvard University Press; London, William Heinemann Ltd. 1918. . Online version at the Perseus Digital Library
Pausanias, Graeciae Descriptio. 3 vols. Leipzig, Teubner. 1903.  Greek text available at the Perseus Digital Library.

Further reading

March, J. Cassell's Dictionary Of Classical Mythology. London, 1999. 

Princesses in Greek mythology
Queens in Greek mythology
Laconian characters in Greek mythology
Arcadian mythology